Chenarud District is a district (bakhsh) in Chadegan County, Isfahan Province, Iran. At the 2006 census, its population was 6,925, in 1,511 families.  The District has no cities. The District has two rural districts (dehestan): Chenarud-e Jonubi Rural District and Chenarud-e Shomali Rural District.

References 

Chadegan County
Districts of Isfahan Province